Floxacin can refer to

 a trade name of the antibiotic ofloxacin
 -floxacin, the common stem of fluoroquinolone antibiotics